Pastorini is a surname, and may refer to:

Dan Pastorini (born 1949), American football player
Manlio Pastorini (1879–1942), Italian gymnast
Rodrigo Pastorini (born 1990), Uruguayan footballer
Signor Pastorini, pseudonym of Charles Walmesley (1722–1797), Roman Catholic Titular Bishop of Rama and Vicar Apostolic of the Western District of England

it:Pastorini